Dennis Lloyd Hallman (born December 2, 1975) is an American former professional mixed martial artist who competed from 1996 to 2015. A veteran of 75 fights, he competed in various promotions including the UFC, Strikeforce, IFL, the World Series of Fighting, Titan FC, Shooto, and King of the Cage. He is also notable for being the only fighter other than George St. Pierre and B.J. Penn to defeat former UFC Welterweight Champion Matt Hughes twice.

Background
Hallman was born in Olympia, Washington, and began training when he was eight years old. He was on the Wrestling team at Yelm High School and won the 135-pound state championship in his senior year. Hallman had planned to continue his career at a community college, but broke his leg during the pre-season training, and had to be sidelined for the entire season. A former high school classmate was sending in video tapes to Battlecade and invited Hallman to fight him because Hallman was a well-known wrestler. Hallman won the fight by a guillotine choke, and his opponent's praise of Hallman's potential encouraged Hallman to pursue a career in MMA. Hallman had an exhibition match three weeks later against a Japanese fighter who was training with Matt Hume, which Hallman also won.

MMA career

Ultimate Fighting Championship
Two of Hallman's biggest achievements are his wins (both by submission in a combined 38 seconds) over UFC Hall of Famer and former welterweight champion Matt Hughes. Their first fight was in 1998 at Extreme Challenge 21, the second in December 2000 at UFC 29: Defense of the Belts.

Title shot
After his second victory over Matt Hughes, Hallman moved down in weight and fought Hughes' teammate Jens Pulver for the lightweight UFC championship in September 2001.  Both Hallman and Pulver wrestled at the high school level in Washington.  Hallman claimed to know Pulver since high school and expressed dislike toward the fighter.  Although Pulver denied knowing Hallman personally, he knew of Hallman through their state champion wrestling careers (at different weight classes).

During the fight Hallman attempted an armbar on Pulver (the same move he used to defeat Hughes in their second meeting), but Pulver countered the technique and followed with a left hook that landed flush on Hallman's chin, staggering him.  Hallman was not able to recover completely from the blow, fighting very passively for the remainder of the bout (which eventually resulted in a unanimous decision loss).  Hallman later stated in interviews that he simply wanted to survive the fight after receiving the blow.

Return to the UFC
Hallman made his return to the UFC against John Howard on December 5, 2009, at The Ultimate Fighter 10 Finale. After controlling Howard on the ground for most of the bout, Hallman lost via KO at 4:55 of the third round.

Hallman then announced that he would try and move down to lightweight.

Hallman then signed to face Ben Saunders in a welterweight bout on August 7, 2010 at UFC 117. Hallman defeated Saunders via unanimous decision.

Hallman faced returning UFC veteran Karo Parisyan on November 20, 2010 at UFC 123. Hallman defeated Parisyan via TKO due to strikes in the first round after he dropped Parisyan with a stiff right, then finished with hammerfists.

Hallman was expected to face TJ Waldburger on March 26, 2011 at UFC Fight Night 24. However, Hallman was forced out of the bout with a knee injury and replaced by Johny Hendricks.

On January 15, 2011, it was announced that Hallman has extended his UFC contract for four additional UFC fights.

Hallman faced Brian Ebersole on August 6, 2011 at UFC 133.  He lost the fight via TKO in the first round. Wearing particularly skimpy blue shorts during the fight, in a ground battle Hallman's left testicle was briefly exposed, eliciting chants of "Put some clothes on" from the crowd and call for regulation of fighter shorts from UFC President Dana White. Hallman has since stated that he wore the shorts as a result of losing a bet.

Hallman next faced John Makdessi on December 10, 2011 at UFC 140. In the lead up to the bout, Hallman missed the 156 pound weight limit by weighing in at 158.5, resulting in a fine and the fight being changed to a catchweight bout. Hallman defeated Makdessi via submission in the first round.

Hallman was expected to face Tony Ferguson on May 5, 2012 at UFC on Fox 3. However, Hallman was forced out of the bout with an injury and replaced by Thiago Tavares.

Hallman was expected to face Thiago Tavares on September 1, 2012 at UFC 151.  However, after UFC 151 was cancelled, Hallman/Tavares was rescheduled to take place on October 5, 2012 at UFC on FX 5. After the weigh-ins of UFC on FX 5 Hallman was 7 lbs. over the 156 lb. weight limit and Tavares said if Hallman could make 3 lbs. over the weight limit he would agree to fight him but Hallman could not and the bout was scrapped from the card. Hallman said he missed weight because of personal issues at home and both him and Tavares were paid their show money. Hallman was released from the UFC for missing weight twice in a row.

World Series Of Fighting
Hallman fought Jon Fitch on July 5, 2014 at World Series of Fighting 11: Gaethje vs. Newell. He lost the fight via unanimous decision.

ProFC
Hallman faced with Russian Hand-to-hand champion and former Bellator MMA fighter Michail Tsarev on November 1, 2014. He lost the fight via TKO.

League S-70
Hallman faced to Mikhail Kolobegov on August 29, 2015 at League S-70: Russia vs. World. He lost the fight via TKO (punches).

Boxing career
Hallman made his professional boxing debut on August 23, 2014 in Tacoma, Washington at the Emerald Queen Casino on the Battle at the Boat 97 card. As of May 2020, his professional boxing record stands at 1-3.

Personal life
Hallman has three sons, Ryley, Richie, and Jayden and a daughter named Kylar, who was born in December 2008.

He has Coeliac Disease, an autoimmune digestive reaction to wheat gluten, which hindered his ability to recover properly from physical activities such as training and fighting.

Mixed martial arts record

|-
| Loss
| align=center|  (1)
| Will Noland
| KO (punches)
| KOTC: Untamed
| 
| align=center| 1
| align=center| 2:38
| Worley, Idaho, United States
|
|-
| Loss
| align=center| 53–19–2 (1)
| Mikhail Kolobegov
| TKO (punches)
| League S-70: Russia vs. World
| 
| align=center| 1
| align=center| 1:19
| Sochi, Russia
|
|-
| Loss
| align=center| 53–18–2 (1)
| Albert Tadevosyan
| TKO (punches)
| MMA Summer Showdown 2
| 
| align=center| 1
| align=center| N/A
| Tulalip, Washington, United States
|
|-
| Loss
| align=center| 53–17–2 (1)
| Yang Dongi
| TKO (punches)
| Top FC 6: Unbreakable Dream
| 
| align=center| 1
| align=center| 3:25
| Seoul, South Korea
|
|-
| Loss
| align=center| 53–16–2 (1)
| Michail Tsarev
| TKO (punches)
| ProFC 56: Baltic Challenge 6
| 
| align=center| 1
| align=center| 2:45
| Kaliningrad, Russia
|
|-
| Loss
| align=center| 53–15–2 (1)
| Jon Fitch
| Decision (unanimous)
| WSOF 11
| 
| align=center|3
| align=center|5:00
| Daytona Beach, Florida, United States
| 
|-
| Win
| align=center| 53–14–2 (1)
| Aleksey Shapovalov
| Submission (rear-naked choke)
| Union of Veterans of Sport: Cup of Champions
| 
| align=center| 2 
| align=center| 1:07
| Novosibirsk, Russia
| 
|-
| Win
| align=center| 52–14–2 (1)
| Dan Hornbuckle
| Decision (majority)
| Titan FC 26
| 
| align=center| 3 
| align=center| 5:00
| Kansas City, Missouri, United States
|
|-
| Win
| align=center| 51–14–2 (1)
| John Makdessi
| Submission (rear-naked choke)
| UFC 140
| 
| align=center| 1
| align=center| 2:58
| Toronto, Ontario, Canada
| 
|-
| Loss
| align=center| 50–14–2 (1)
| Brian Ebersole
| TKO (elbows)
| UFC 133
| 
| align=center| 1
| align=center| 4:28
| Philadelphia, Pennsylvania, United States
| 
|-
| Win
| align=center| 50–13–2 (1)
| Karo Parisyan
| TKO (punches)
| UFC 123
| 
| align=center| 1
| align=center| 1:47
| Auburn Hills, Michigan, United States
| 
|-
| Win
| align=center| 49–13–2 (1)
| Ben Saunders
| Decision (unanimous)
| UFC 117
| 
| align=center| 3
| align=center| 5:00
| Oakland, California, United States
| 
|-
| Loss
| align=center| 48–13–2 (1)
| John Howard
| KO (punches)
| The Ultimate Fighter: Heavyweights Finale
| 
| align=center| 3
| align=center| 4:55
| Las Vegas, Nevada, United States
| 
|-
| Win
| align=center| 48–12–2 (1)
| Justin Davis
| Submission (rear-naked choke)
| Strikeforce Challengers: Villasenor vs. Cyborg
| 
| align=center| 1
| align=center| 0:20
| Kent, Washington, United States
| 
|-
| Win
| align=center| 47–12–2 (1)
| Danny Ruiz
| Submission (rear-naked choke)
| SRP: March Badness
| 
| align=center| 1
| align=center| 1:50
| Pensacola, Florida, United States
| 
|-
| Win
| align=center| 46–12–2 (1)
| Jeremiah Metcalf
| Submission (heel hook)
| Strikeforce: Four Men Enter, One Man Survives
| 
| align=center| 1
| align=center| 1:39
| San Jose, California, United States
| 
|-
| Win
| align=center| 45–12–2 (1)
| Dave Knight
| Submission (rear-naked choke)
| USA MMA: Rumble on the River 4
| 
| align=center| 1
| align=center| N/A
| Fairbanks, Alaska, United States
| 
|-
| Win
| align=center| 44–12–2 (1)
| Jeff Quinlan
| Decision (majority)
| IFL: Gracie vs. Miletich
| 
| align=center| 3
| align=center| 4:00
| Moline, Illinois, United States
| 
|-
| Loss
| align=center| 43–12–2 (1)
| Ryan McGivern
| Decision (unanimous)
| IFL: Championship 2006
| 
| align=center| 3
| align=center| 4:00
| Atlantic City, New Jersey, United States
| 
|-
| Win
| align=center| 43–11–2 (1)
| Delson Heleno
| DQ (illegal kick)
| IFL: Legends Championship 2006
| 
| align=center| 1
| align=center| 3:59
| Atlantic City, New Jersey, United States
| 
|-
| Win
| align=center| 42–11–2 (1)
| Ray Perales
| Submission (rear-naked choke)
| Valor Fighting: Showdown at Cache Creek
| 
| align=center| 1
| align=center| 0:33
| Brooks, California, United States
| 
|-
| Loss
| align=center| 41–11–2 (1)
| Jorge Rivera
| Decision (unanimous)
| UFC 55
| 
| align=center| 3
| align=center| 5:00
| Uncasville, Connecticut, United States
| 
|-
| Win
| align=center| 41–10–2 (1)
| Nick Tyree
| Submission (guillotine choke)
| Valor Fighting: Medford Mayhem
| 
| align=center| 1
| align=center| 2:27
| Medford, Oregon, United States
| 
|-
| Loss
| align=center| 40–10–2 (1)
| Ansar Chalangov
| TKO (corner stoppage)
| Euphoria: USA vs. Russia
| 
| align=center| 2
| align=center| 5:00
| Atlantic City, New Jersey, United States
| 
|-
| Win
| align=center| 40–9–2 (1)
| Cedric Marks
| Submission (triangle choke)
| XFC: Dome of Destruction 2
| 
| align=center| 1
| align=center| 2:48
| Tacoma, Washington, United States
| 
|-
| Win
| align=center| 39–9–2 (1)
| Rory Singer
| Submission (rear-naked choke)
| AFC 11: Absolute Fighting Championships 11
| 
| align=center| 1
| align=center| 1:19
| Fort Lauderdale, Florida, United States
| 
|-
| Win
| align=center| 38–9–2 (1)
| Ross Ebañez
| Submission (rear-naked choke)
| ROTR 6: Rumble on the Rock 6
| 
| align=center| 1
| align=center| 1:13
| Honolulu, Hawaii, United States
| 
|-
| Win
| align=center| 37–9–2 (1)
| Landon Showalter
| Submission (triangle choke)
| SF 7: Frightnight
| 
| align=center| 1
| align=center| 2:04
| Gresham, Oregon, United States
| 
|-
| Win
| align=center| 36–9–2 (1)
| Mike Seal
| Submission (rear-naked choke)
| SF 6: Battleground in Reno
| 
| align=center| 1
| align=center| 0:50
| Reno, Nevada, United States
| 
|-
| Loss
| align=center| 35–9–2 (1)
| Frank Trigg
| TKO (punches)
| UFC 48
| 
| align=center| 1
| align=center| 4:15
| Las Vegas, Nevada, United States
| 
|-
| Win
| align=center| 35–8–2 (1)
| Rob Mendez
| Submission (rear-naked choke)
| USA MMA: Extreme Cage Combat
| 
| align=center| 1
| align=center| 0:56
| Shelton, Washington, United States
| 
|-
| Win
| align=center| 34–8–2 (1)
| Jason Stumpf
| Submission (triangle choke)
| URC 7: Ultimate Ring Challenge 7
| 
| align=center| 1
| align=center| 2:43
| Yelm, Washington, United States
| 
|-
| Draw
| align=center| 33–8–2 (1)
| J.T. Taylor
| Draw
| DB 9: DesertBrawl 9
| 
| align=center| 3
| align=center| 5:00
| Bend, Oregon, United States
| 
|-
| Win
| align=center| 33–8–1 (1)
| Ray Cooper
| Submission (guillotine choke)
| Rumble on the Rock 4
| 
| align=center| 1
| align=center| 0:43
| Honolulu, Hawaii, United States
| 
|-
| Loss
| align=center| 32–8–1 (1)
| Drew Fickett
| Decision (split)
| KOTC 28: More Punishment
| 
| align=center| 3
| align=center| 5:00
| Reno, Nevada, United States
|
|-
| Win
| align=center| 32–7–1 (1)
| Brandon Olsen
| Submission (armbar)
| AOW: Art of War 2
| 
| align=center| 1
| align=center| N/A
| Kalispell, Montana, United States
| 
|-
| Win
| align=center| 31–7–1 (1)
| Chris Irvine
| Submission (rear-naked choke)
| URC 5: Ultimate Ring Challenge 5
| 
| align=center| 1
| align=center| 1:43
| Lacey, Washington, United States
| 
|-
| Win
| align=center| 30–7–1 (1)
| Lee Henderson
| TKO (punches)
| XRW: Xtreme Ring Wars 2
| 
| align=center| 1
| align=center| 0:37
| Pasco, Washington, United States
| 
|-
| Win
| align=center| 29–7–1 (1)
| Vince Guzman
| Submission (rear-naked choke)
| XRW: Xtreme Ring Wars 1
| 
| align=center| 1
| align=center| 3:28
| Wenatchee, Washington, United States
| 
|-
| Draw
| align=center| 28–7–1 (1)
| Ronald Jhun
| Draw
| KOTC 19: Street Fighter
| 
| align=center| 2
| align=center| 5:00
| San Jacinto, California, United States
| 
|-
| Loss
| align=center| 28–7 (1)
| Frank Trigg
| TKO (punches)
| WFA 3: Level 3
| 
| align=center| 1
| align=center| 3:50
| Las Vegas, Nevada, United States
| 
|-
| Win
| align=center| 28–6 (1)
| Betiss Mansouri
| Submission (triangle choke)
| KOTC 18: Sudden Impact
| 
| align=center| 1
| align=center| 3:39
| Reno, Nevada, United States
|
|-
| Win
| align=center| 27–6 (1)
| Adam Oliver
| Submission (rear-naked choke)
| UFCF: Rumble in Rochester
| 
| align=center| 1
| align=center| 2:59
| Rochester, Washington, United States
| 
|-
| Win
| align=center| 26–6 (1)
| Gary Dobbins
| Submission (rear-naked choke)
| PPKA: Road to Victory
| 
| align=center| 1
| align=center| 0:20
| Longview, Washington, United States
| 
|-
| Win
| align=center| 25–6 (1)
| Chris Silva
| Submission (armbar)
| URC 2: Ultimate Ring Challenge 2
| 
| align=center| 1
| align=center| 2:00
| Olympia, Washington, United States
| 
|-
| NC
| align=center| 24–6 (1)
| Denis Kang
| No Contest
| WFF 1: World Freestyle Fighting 1
| 
| align=center| 2
| align=center| 3:15
| Kelowna, British Columbia, Canada
| 
|-
| Win
| align=center| 24–6
| Buck Greer
| Decision (split)
| UA 2: The Gathering
| 
| align=center| 3
| align=center| 5:00
| Cabazon, California, United States
| 
|-
| Win
| align=center| 23–6
| Mathias Hughes
| Submission (rear-naked choke)
| MFC 3: Canadian Pride
| 
| align=center| 1
| align=center| 1:05
| Grande Prairie, Alberta
| 
|-
| Loss
| align=center| 22–6
| Amaury Bitetti
| Decision (split)
| Shogun 1: Shogun 1
| 
| align=center| 3
| align=center| 5:00
| Honolulu, Hawaii, United States
|
|-
| Loss
| align=center| 22–5
| Jens Pulver
| Decision (unanimous)
| UFC 33
| 
| align=center| 5
| align=center| 5:00
| Las Vegas, Nevada, United States
| 
|-
| Win
| align=center| 22–4
| Earl Thompson
| Submission (rear-naked choke)
| PPKA: Muckelshoot
| 
| align=center| 1
| align=center| 0:12
| Auburn, Washington, United States
| 
|-
| Win
| align=center| 21–4
| Dan Shenk
| Submission (rear-naked choke)
| AMC: Revenge of the Warriors
| 
| align=center| 1
| align=center| N/A
| Rochester, Washington, United States
| 
|-
| Win
| align=center| 20–4
| Eric Dahlberg
| KO (punch)
| RITR 2: Rumble in the Ring 2 
| 
| align=center| 1
| align=center| 0:12
| Auburn, Washington, United States
| 
|-
| Win
| align=center| 19–4
| Brent Russell
| Submission (americana)
| AMC: Return of the Gladiators 3
| 
| align=center| 1
| align=center| N/A
| Rochester, Washington, United States
| 
|-
| Win
| align=center| 18–4
| Matt Hughes
| Submission (armbar)
| UFC 29
| 
| align=center| 1
| align=center| 0:20
| Tokyo, Japan
|
|-
| Win
| align=center| 17–4
| Jordon Klimp
| Decision (unanimous)
| UFCF: Tornado Challenge
| 
| align=center| 3
| align=center| 3:00
| Yelm, Washington, United States
| 
|-
| Win
| align=center| 16–4
| Jeff Sears
| Submission (rear-naked choke)
| PPKA: Wenatchee Rumble
| 
| align=center| 1
| align=center| 2:15
| Wenatchee, Washington, United States
| 
|-
| Win
| align=center| 15–4
| Murrey Sholtey
| TKO (punches)
| AMC: Return of the Gladiators 1
| 
| align=center| 1
| align=center| 3:30
| Rochester, Washington, United States
| 
|-
| Loss
| align=center| 14–4
| Paul Rodriguez
| KO (punch)
| HOOKnSHOOT: Meltdown
| 
| align=center| 3
| align=center| 0:18
| Evansville, Indiana, United States
| 
|-
| Loss
| align=center| 14–3
| Caol Uno
| Decision (unanimous)
| Shooto: R.E.A.D. 3
| 
| align=center| 3
| align=center| 5:00
| Osaka, Japan
|
|-
| Win
| align=center| 14–2
| Danny Bennett
| Technical Submission (armbar)
| UFCF: Battle in Bellevue 2
| 
| align=center| 1
| align=center| 3:16
| Bellevue, Washington, United States
| 
|-
| Loss
| align=center| 13–2
| Dave Menne
| Decision (unanimous)
| Shooto: 10th Anniversary Event
| 
| align=center| 3
| align=center| 5:00
| Yokohama, Japan
|
|-
| Win
| align=center| 13–1
| Danny Bennett
| Submission (americana)
| UFCF: Battle in Bellevue 1
| 
| align=center| 1
| align=center| N/A
| Bellevue, Washington, United States
| 
|-
| Loss
| align=center| 12–1
| Mike McClure
| Decision (unanimous)
| EC 23: Extreme Challenge 23
| 
| align=center| 1
| align=center| 15:00
| Indianapolis, Indiana, United States
| 
|-
| Win
| align=center| 12–0
| Gerrald Ballinger
| Submission (armbar)
| URC 1: Ultimate Ring Challenge 1
| 
| align=center| 1
| align=center| 1:11
| Wenatchee, Washington, United States
| 
|-
| Win
| align=center| 11–0
| Matt Hughes
| Technical Submission (guillotine choke)
| rowspan=3|Extreme Challenge 21
| rowspan=3|
| align=center| 1
| align=center| 0:17
| rowspan=3|Hayward, Wisconsin, United States
| 
|-
| Win
| align=center| 10–0
| Shannon Ritch
| Submission (punches)
| align=center| 1
| align=center| 0:44
|
|-
| Win
| align=center| 9–0
| Allan Mollring
| Submission (armbar)
| align=center| 1
| align=center| 2:52
| 
|-
| Win
| align=center| 8–0
| Phil Johns
| Submission (guillotine choke)
| EC 20: Extreme Challenge 20
| 
| align=center| 1
| align=center| 3:47
| Davenport, Iowa, United States
| 
|-
| Win
| align=center| 7–0
| Leigh Remedios
| Submission (kimura)
| UWC: Ultimate Warrior Challenge
| 
| align=center| 1
| align=center| 9:45
| Vancouver, British Columbia, Canada
| 
|-
| Win
| align=center| 6–0
| Ulan Moore
| Submission (rear-naked choke)
| UFCF: Night of Champions
| 
| align=center| 1
| align=center| 1:21
| Washington
| 
|-
| Win
| align=center| 5–0
| Sean Haley
| Submission (bulldog choke)
| EC 21: Extreme Challenge 21
| 
| align=center| 1
| align=center| 1:05
| Washington
| 
|-
| Win
| align=center| 4–0
| Jose De La Cruz
| Submission (americana)
| TS: Tae Sho
| 
| align=center| 1
| align=center| 3:28
| Tacoma, Washington, United States
| 
|-
| Win
| align=center| 3–0
| Zack Gross
| Decision (unanimous)
| UFCF: Clash of the Titans
| 
| align=center| 1
| align=center| 5:00
| Washington
| 
|-
| Win
| align=center| 2–0
| Hiroki Noritsugi
| Decision (unanimous)
| rowspan=2|UFCF: Ultimate Fighting 2
| rowspan=2|
| align=center| 1
| align=center| 5:00
| rowspan=2|Kirkland, Washington, United States
| 
|-
| Win
| align=center| 1–0
| Hiroki Noritsugi
| Submission (guillotine choke)
| align=center| 1
| align=center| 0:20
|

Professional boxing record

References

External links

Official UFC Profile

1975 births
Living people
Sportspeople from Olympia, Washington
American male mixed martial artists
Mixed martial artists from Washington (state)
Lightweight mixed martial artists
Welterweight mixed martial artists
Middleweight mixed martial artists
Mixed martial artists utilizing boxing
Mixed martial artists utilizing wrestling
Mixed martial artists utilizing Brazilian jiu-jitsu
American practitioners of Brazilian jiu-jitsu
People awarded a black belt in Brazilian jiu-jitsu
American sportspeople in doping cases
Doping cases in mixed martial arts
People from Thurston County, Washington
Ultimate Fighting Championship male fighters
American male boxers